= Spying in South Asia =

2024 book by Paul McGarr

- Author: Paul McGarr
- Language: English
- Genre: Political History
- Published: Cambridge University Press, 2024
- Pages: 358
- ISBN: 1108843670

Spying in South Asia: Britain, the United States, and India’s Secret Cold War was authored by Paul McGarr (Cambridge University Press, 2024) who recently published book examines the interventions of British and U.S. intelligence and security services in postcolonial India, analyzing their strategic, political, and socio-cultural impacts. McGarr’s work significantly focuses on intelligence operations beyond the Anglosphere and illuminates the “lost dimension” of the Cold War. Grounded in primary sources from archives in the U.S., Britain, and India, the book—authored by an experienced intelligence historian—traces the consequences of covert interventions by British and American agencies in countering “red shadows” (Soviet and Indian communism) and their clandestine collaborations with Indian agencies.

The interventions of British and American intelligence during the Cold War, as McGarr argues, reflect India's and posture—a central thesis of the book. He contends that these actions reinforced a culture of conspiracy-mindedness within India.

== Content ==
Paul McGarr’s book,Spying in South Asia by Paul McGarr , is the first comprehensive history of India’s covert operations during the Cold War. The book examines the influence of Indian politicians, human rights activists, and journalists on British and U.S. intelligence services, and how their activities have shaped the political, social, and cultural landscape of South Asia, particularly in India. The notion of a “foreign hand”—whether real or perceived—has played a significant role in India’s political discourse, journalism, and cultural production. Spying in South Asia addresses the relationship between intelligence and governance in the region and explores the challenges faced by organizations and governments dedicated to upholding democracy.

The first section of the book illustrates how a vast conspiracy and the justification for suppression in South Asia have influenced the activities of foreign intelligence agencies. In the second section, the author demonstrates how Indian politicians have exploited conspiracy and suppression to advance their electoral ambitions.

India has experienced border disputes with China. At the same time, the United States was implementing a policy aimed at combating communism. Consequently, India sought intelligence cooperation with the CIA to address its conflicts with China. However, Prime Minister Nehru was wary that the Americans might take advantage of this situation to increase their intervention in India. The book notes that the CIA had established a significant presence in India, gaining access to virtually every government and internal document. To monitor China’s nuclear tests, the United States installed equipment along the India-China border in the Himalayan peaks. This operation was named "Operation Hat." According to the book, these installations enabled the U.S. to obtain precise intelligence regarding China’s ballistic missiles. The author asserts that the operation was successful and provided critical information to the U.S. However, one of these devices went missing, and some believe it may have contributed to certain natural disasters in the region.

The research presented in this book is precise, highly detailed, and scientifically rigorous. For the first time, it explores the interventions of Western and American intelligence agencies in post-colonial India.

McGarr has sought to elucidate the conflicting motives underlying India's interactions with Britain and the United States, while neglecting the personal biases of the narrators and the nationalist agendas present in official reports. The issues highlighted in this book are clearly reflected in India's current political landscape. For instance, in his interactions with Western and American intelligence services, Nehru exercised the necessary caution and maintained considerable restraint in cooperating with American agencies. He consistently emphasized the importance of mobilizing indigenous talent.

== Reception ==
According to Matthew Jones from the London School of Economics and Political Science, the book "Spying in South Asia" is notable for its well-documented and meticulous research, as well as its examination of the impact of intelligence services' interventions on the culture, society, and politics of South Asia.
